Pinball (released 30 January 2015 in Germany by the label ACT Music – ACT 9032-2) is the 6th album of the Norwegian saxophonist Marius Neset.

Background 
Neset and his comusicians here presents a shimmering kaleidoscopic album of different expressions and influences, and delight with compositional and instrumental complexity. At the same time, Neset sounds more mature, soulful and melodic than ever before.

Critical reception 

The All About Jazz reviewer John Kelman awarded the album 4.5 stars and the review by Ian Patterson of the British newspaper The Guardian awarded the album 4 stars, The Irish Times reviewer Cormac Larkin awarded the album 4 stars.

The Guardian critique Ian Patterson, in his review of Neset's album Pinball states:
''... The folk and world-music sweep of its snaking melodies, the subtlety of its tonal contrasts and its mix of intensity and insinuation make Pinball another step-change in Neset’s already spectacular career ...

Track listing

Personnel 
Band quintet
 Marius Neset - tenor and soprano saxophones
 Ivo Neame - piano, Hammond B3 organ, CP 80, clavinet
 Jim Hart - vibraphone and marimba, additional drums (track: #4)
 Petter Eldh - double bass
 Anton Eger - drums and percussion

Additional musicians
 Andreas Brantelid - cello (tracks: #1, 2, 6 and 7)
 Rune Tonsgaard Sørensen - violin (tracks: #1 and 11
 Ingrid Neset - flute (tracks: #1, 5 and 11)
 August Wanngren - tambourine (track: #3)
 Pinball band - clapping (tracks: #1, 2 & 7)

Credits 
 Recorded by Henning Vatne Svoren at Ocean Sound Recordings, 30 June - 2 July 2014
 Mixed by August Wanngren at We Know Music Studios
 Mastered by Thomas Eberger at Stockholm Mastering
 Artwork by Rune Mortensen
 Cover photo by Lisbeth Holten
 Produced by Marius Neset and Anton Eger

References

External links 
Marius Neset website
Marius Neset - 'Pinball' on YouTube

Marius Neset albums
ACT Music albums
2015 albums
2015 in Norwegian music